Stuart Kingsley Holland (born 25 March 1940) is a British economist and former politician.

As a Member of Parliament for the Labour Party, Holland represented the Vauxhall constituency in Lambeth, London, from 1979 until 1989, when he resigned his seat in order to take up a post at the European University Institute, Florence.

He has held teaching and research posts at the universities of Oxford, Sussex, the European University Institute, the universities of Roskilde and Coimbra; has authored over 180 articles, many in referred journals, chapters in books and other papers and conference presentations; authored, co-authored or edited over 15 books on economic theory and policy, international trade, economic integration, regional theory and policy, social policies, development economics and global governance. Holland currently is a Visiting Professor at the Faculty of Economics of the University of Coimbra and a Senior Scholar of the Institute of Social and European Studies, Köszeg, Hungary.

Biography

Born in 1940, Stuart Holland studied and taught history and political theory at University of Oxford, then became an adviser to Harold Wilson on European affairs and gained the consent of Charles De Gaulle for a second British application to join the European Community.

Resigning from 10 Downing Street when Wilson did not follow this through, including the proposal for a European Technology Community and for mutual currency support, he gained an economics doctorate at Oxford, and drafted what in the early 1970s became the economic programme of the British Labour Party when researching and teaching at Sussex University.

His case for state holding companies in energy and industry led to the creation of the British National Oil Corporation and a National Enterprise Board. His proposals for regional development agencies led to the creation of the Scottish, Welsh and Northern Ireland Development Agencies and the Greater London Enterprise Board (now London Enterprise).

From 1979 to 1989 he was Labour Member of Parliament for Lambeth Vauxhall. As shadow minister for development cooperation from 1983 to 1987 he drafted the 1985 Global Challenge report for the Socialist International, and led the first Labour Party delegation to China since Clement Attlee in 1952. He then was shadow financial secretary to the Treasury before leaving Westminster to help Jacques Delors shape EU policies for economic and social cohesion.

MPs resign from the House of Commons by being appointed to an office of profit under the Crown.  Holland was appointed to the sinecure post of Steward of the Chiltern Hundreds, and held it for five years and 247 days, the longest period the post has been held since its creation in 1850.

His proposals to Delors for US New Deal style bonds to offset the deflationary Maastricht debt and deficit conditions have resurfaced during the Eurozone crisis. His case to Delors on the case for a New Bretton Woods Conference was endorsed by Bill Clinton at his first G7 in Naples but not followed through by European governments.

His more recent case that the G20 should constitute the governing body of a World Development Organization also has attracted high level interest from the Permanent Representatives to the UN of China, Japan, India, South Africa, Brazil and Mexico.

His earlier advice to Andreas Papandreou, backed by François Mitterrand, prompted the first revision of the Rome Treaty, with commitments to both an internal market and to economic and social cohesion in the 1986 Single European Act.

His later advice to Portuguese Prime Minister António Guterres included a cohesion and convergence remit for the European Investment Bank to invest in health, education, urban regeneration and new technology without this counting on national debt. In 1997 the European Council endorsed this as did employer and trades union representatives on the Economic and Social Committee of the EU in 2012.

In 2010, he co-authored A Modest Proposal with the Greek economist Yanis Varoufakis.

Bibliography
The State as Entrepreneur, New Dimensions for Public Enterprise: The IRI State Shareholding Formula (1972) editor
Socialist Challenge (1975)
Capital versus the Regions (1976)
The Regional Problem (1976)
Beyond Capitalist Planning (1978) editor
Uncommon Market: Capital, Class and Power in the European Community (1980)
Out of Crisis. A Project for European Recovery (1983) editor
Kissinger's Kingdom: a Counter Report on Central America (1984) with Donald Anderson
Never Kneel Down: Drought, Development and Liberation in Eritrea (1984) with James Firebrace
The Market Economy: From Micro to Mesoeconomics (1987)
The Global Economy: From Micro to Mesoeconomics (1987)
Central America: The Future of Economic Integration (1989) editor with George Irvin
The European Imperative: Economic and Social Cohesion in the 1990s (1993)
Towards a New Bretton Woods: Alternatives for the Global Economy (1994)
A Modest Proposal (2010) with Yanis Varoufakis
Europe in Question: And What to Do About it (2014)

Notes

External links
 

1940 births
Living people
Academics of the University of Oxford
Alumni of the University of Oxford
British economics writers
Labour Party (UK) MPs for English constituencies
People educated at Christ's Hospital
UK MPs 1979–1983
UK MPs 1983–1987
UK MPs 1987–1992
Academic staff of the University of Coimbra
Academics of the University of Sussex